Keith Walker (born 17 April 1966) is a Scottish former footballer who played as a defender for Stirling Albion and St Mirren before playing in the Football League for Swansea City.

Honours
Swansea City
Football League Third Division play-offs runner-up: 1997

References

External links

Scottish footballers
English Football League players
Swansea City A.F.C. players
1966 births
Living people
Stirling Albion F.C. players
St Mirren F.C. players
Scottish Football League players
Association football central defenders
Footballers from Edinburgh
Merthyr Tydfil F.C. players
Scottish football managers
Merthyr Tydfil F.C. managers